is a Japanese politician, an independent and member of the House of Councillors in the Diet (national legislature). He was elected to the House of Councillors for the first time in 2007 after running unsuccessfully for the House of Representatives in 2005.

External links
  

Members of the House of Councillors (Japan)
Living people
1976 births
21st-century Japanese politicians
Date of birth missing (living people)